The canton of Mauguio is an administrative division of the Hérault department, southern France. Its borders were modified at the French canton reorganisation which came into effect in March 2015. Its seat is in Mauguio.

Composition

It consists of the following communes:
 
Candillargues
La Grande-Motte
Lansargues
Mauguio
Mudaison
Palavas-les-Flots
Saint-Aunès
Valergues

Councillors

Pictures of the canton

References

Cantons of Hérault